Yamini Singh (born 20 March 1971) is an Indian film and television actress who works in Bollywood films and television. Her first film role came in K. Bikram Singh's Tarpan (1994), also starring Om Puri, Revathi, Manohar Singh and Mita Vashisht. Some of her television shows are: Bandhan (1999), Daaman (2001), Chalti Ka Naam Gaadi...Let's Go (2015), Mere Ghar Aayi Ek Nanhi Pari (2009), Har Ghar Kuch Kehta Hai (2007) and Jhoome Jiiya Re (2007).

Career 
Singh debuted in the K. Bikram Singh's Revathi and the Mita Vashisht-starred film Tarpan (1994), where she played the role of Om Puri's daughter. After this, she played the character of "Lovely" in the TV series Colgate Top 10.

She has acted in soap operas including: Bandhan, Daaman, Ghar Ek Mandir, Koshish - Ek Aashaa, Shehnai, Hukum Mere Aaka, Jabb Love Hua, Shaadi Street, Hari Mirchi Laal Mirchi, Hum Hai Na La-Jawab, Meri Doli Tere Angana, Har Ghar Kuch Kehta Hai, Bidaai, Jhoome Jiiya Re, Teen Bahuraaniyaan, Mere Ghar Aayi Ek Nanhi Pari and Chalti Ka Naam Gaadi...Let's Go. She has also had episodic roles in Savdhaan India on Life OK. She appeared in several advertisements, and had a role in a play called Silsilay at Mallika Sarabhai's Natrani.

In the 2018 Hindi feature film Evening Shadows directed by Sridhar Rangayan and produced by Solaris Pictures, Yamini Singh plays the role of Sarita, a South Indian woman who tries to look at the brighter side of life, despite coming from a broken marriage due to domestic violence.

Filmography

Films

Television

Web series

See also 

List of Indian film actresses

References

External links

 
 Actor Yamini Singh makes comeback on TV after 8 years on Hindustan Times

Indian television actresses
Indian film actresses
Actresses from New Delhi
Living people
1971 births
Actresses in Hindi cinema
Actresses in Hindi television
Indian soap opera actresses
20th-century Indian actresses
21st-century Indian actresses